Yacoub Makzoume (born 4 March 1995) is a Syrian tennis player. He is a member of the Syria Davis Cup team.

Makzoume has represented Syria at the Davis Cup, where he has a win-loss record of 11–9.

Early life
Yacoub Makzoume was born in Lattakia, a town in Syria. His father Raouf Makzoume is a businessman and also a Tennis Coach he thought Yacoub how to play Tennis. Yacoub's biggest brother Robert Makzoume was also a tennis player. Yacoub Started to play tennis when he was 6 years old and won many Syrian junior tournaments. He accomplished many achievements: Runner-up in West Asia U-13 Jordan 2008. Ranked 4 in Asia u-14 in 2009.

Professional tennis career
Yacoub turned professional in 2011 and play with Junior Syria Davis Cup team.
Won several Junior and Men titles in Syria and Lebanon.
And he participated in many competition For ITF.

Davis Cup

Participation: (11–9)
Yacoub's First Participation with Syria Davis Cup team was in Philippine 2013 but he didn't play any game.
Then he participated 3 times in a row in 2017,2018 and 2019 in group 3 and qualified with them to group 2.

   indicates the outcome of the Davis Cup match followed by the score, date, place of event, the zonal classification and its phase, and the court surface.

References

External links
 

1995 births
Living people
Syrian male tennis players
Syrian sportspeople